Maialen Zelaia Mendizábal (born 21 August 1988) is a Spanish retired footballer who played as a forward.

References

1988 births
Living people
Spanish women's footballers
Footballers from San Sebastián
Añorga KKE players
Primera División (women) players
Real Sociedad (women) players
Women's association football forwards